Alpha-2-macroglobulin-like 1 abbreviated as α2ML1 is a protein that in humans is encoded by the A2ML1 gene. α2ML1  is a large, 180 kDa protein found in the epidermis. It is able to the inhibit the chymotryptic activity of KLK7.

Function 

This gene encodes a member of the alpha-macroglobulin superfamily. The encoded protein acts as an inhibitor for several proteases, and has been reported as the p170 antigen recognized by autoantibodies in the autoimmune disease paraneoplastic pemphigus (PNP). Alternative splicing results in multiple transcript variants.

Clinical significance 

Mutations in A2ML1 are associated to Noonan-like syndrome.

References

External links

Further reading 

 
 
 

Protease inhibitors